Tech Mahindra is an Indian multinational information technology services and consulting company. Part of the Mahindra Group, the company is headquartered in Pune and has its registered office in Mumbai. Tech Mahindra is a 6.0 billion company with over 158,000 employees across 90 countries. The company was ranked #5 in India's IT firms and overall #47 on Fortune India 500 list for 2019.

On 25 June 2013, Tech Mahindra announced the completion of a merger with Mahindra Satyam. Tech Mahindra has 1262 active clients as of June 2022. Tech Mahindra Limited has entered into share subscription agreement to acquire 26% equity shares in Upendra Singh Multi Transmission Private Limited. The acquisition would enable the Company to procure 1.5 MW of Solar Energy for its captive consumption at its facilities located in Noida, UP.

History

Mahindra & Mahindra started a joint venture with British Telecom in 1986 as a technology outsourcing firm. British Telecom initially had around a 30 percent stake in Tech Mahindra. In December 2010, British Telecom sold 5.5 percent of its stake in Tech Mahindra to Mahindra & Mahindra for Rs. 451 crore. In August 2012, British Telecom sold 14.1 percent of its stake to institutional investors for about Rs. 1,395 crore. In December 2012, British Telecom sold its remaining 9.1 per cent (11.6 million shares) shareholding to institutional investors for a total gross cash proceeds of Rs. 1,011.4 crores. This sale marked the exit of British Telecom from Tech Mahindra.

Acquisition of Satyam Computer Services Ltd.
After the Satyam scandal of 2008-09 Tech Mahindra bid for Satyam Computer Services, and emerged as a top bidder with an offer of INR 58.90 a share for a 31 percent stake in the company, beating a strong rival Larsen & Toubro. After evaluating the bids, the government-appointed board of Satyam Computer announced on 13 April 2009: "its Board of Directors has selected Venturbay Consultants Private Limited, a subsidiary controlled by Tech Mahindra Limited as the highest bidder to acquire a controlling stake in the Company, subject to the approval of the Hon'ble Company Law Board."

Merger with Mahindra Satyam

Tech Mahindra announced its merger with Mahindra Satyam on March 21, 2012, after getting approval of the two company boards to create an IT company worth US$2.5 billion. The two firms had received the go-ahead for the merger from the Bombay Stock Exchange and the National Stock Exchange. On June 11, 2013, Andhra Pradesh High Court gave its approval for merging Mahindra Satyam with Tech Mahindra, after getting approval from the Bombay high court. Vineet Nayyar said that technical approvals from the Registrar of Companies in Andhra Pradesh and Maharashtra are required which will be done in two to four weeks, and within eight weeks, the new merged entity would be in place. The new organization would be led by Anand Mahindra as Chairman, Vineet Nayyar as Vice Chairman, and C. P. Gurnani as the CEO and Managing Director. On June 25, 2013, Tech Mahindra announced the completion of its merger with Mahindra Satyam to create the nation's fifth largest software services company with a turnover of US$2.7 billion. Tech Mahindra got the approval from the registrar of companies for the merger at 11:45 pm on June 24, 2013. July 5, 2013 has been determined as record date on which the Satyam Computer Services ('Mahindra Satyam') shares will be swapped for Tech Mahindra shares under the approved scheme. Mahindra Satyam (Satyam Computer Services), was suspended from trading with effect from July 4, 2013, following the merger. Tech Mahindra completed share swap and allocated its shares to the shareholders of Satyam Computer Services on July 12, 2013. The stock exchanges have accorded their approval for trading the new shares with effect from July 12, 2013 onwards. Tech Mahindra posted net profit of INR 686 crore for the first quarter ended June 30, 2013, up 27% compared to the corresponding quarter the previous year.

Later years
In 2014, Tech Mahindra acquired Lightbridge Communications Corporation (LCC), one of the largest independent telecom services companies in the world with local presence in over 50 countries. In 2015, Tech Mahindra acquired SOFGEN Holdings, a 450-employee Swiss IT firm serving the financial services industry Tech Mahindra purchased a controlling stake in Pininfarina S.p.A., an Italian brand in automotive and industrial design Tech Mahindra announced the launch of its Automation Framework AQT (Automation, Quality, Time) By March 2016, Tech Mahindra's post-tax earnings had surged past that of M&M. Tech Mahindra said it would buy financial technology firm Target Group to boost its platform business process-as-a-service offering in the banking sector. In 2017, Tech Mahindra and Midad Holdings, a part of diversified business conglomerate Al Fozan Group announced the launch of a joint venture, Tech Mahindra Arabia Ltd. On the basis of a global partnership agreement signed, Tech Mahindra will market Huawei's enterprise products and services across 44 countries including India. Tech Mahindra announced that it has signed a definitive agreement to acquire CJS Solutions Group LLC, a US-based healthcare Information Technology consulting company which does business as (DBA) “The HCI Group.” In 2019, Tech Mahindra acquired DynaCommerce BV. Tech Mahindra, during September 2019, has acquired BORN Group, a New York City based digital content and production agency, for $95 million in an all-cash deal.

In March 2021, Tech Mahindra partnered with US-based business intelligence analytics company ThoughtSpot. In April 2021, Tech Mahindra acquired US-based DigitalOnUs, a hybrid cloud and DevOps services provider for $120 million. In June 2021, Tech Mahindra also acquired another US-based (New Jersey) Brainscale Inc., a leading cloud consulting and cloud transformation service provider for $30 million, and Colorado-based Eventus solutions group for $44 million. Overall, spending around $230 million to buy 5 companies in the year 2021 itself.

Mohit Joshi  is scheduled to join Tech Mahindra as the new MD and CEO on December 20, 2023, which is well in advance of Gurnani's retirement date.

Locations
Tech Mahindra has offices in more than 60 countries.

India: Chennai, Hyderabad, Kochi, Kolkata, Mumbai, Mysore, Noida, Nagpur, Pune, Visakhapatnam, Warangal, Vijayawada and Bhubaneswar 
  Pacific: China, Hong Kong, Indonesia, Japan, Malaysia, Philippines, Singapore, South Korea, Taiwan, Thailand, and Vietnam
North America and South America: Argentina, Brazil, Canada, Bolivia, Colombia, Costa Rica, Ecuador, Guatemala, Mexico, Panama, Peru, and the United States of America
Australia: Australia and New Zealand
Europe: Austria, Belgium, Bulgaria, Czech Republic, Denmark, Finland, France, Germany, Hungary, Ireland, Italy, Luxembourg, Netherlands, Norway, Romania, Spain, Sweden, Switzerland, and United Kingdom
Africa: Chad, Republic of the Congo, Democratic Republic of the Congo, Gabon, Ghana, Kenya, Malawi, Nigeria, Rwanda, South Africa, Egypt , Uganda and Zambia
Middle East: Bahrain, Israel, Oman, Qatar, Saudi Arabia, Turkey and the United Arab Emirates

See also

List of IT consulting firms
 List of Indian IT companies
 Fortune India 500 
 Software industry in Telangana

References

External links
 

International information technology consulting firms
Information technology consulting firms of India
Software companies of India
Companies established in 1986
Financial services companies based in Pune
Outsourcing companies
Outsourcing in India
Mahindra Group
1986 establishments in Maharashtra
Information technology companies of Bhubaneswar
Information technology companies of India
NIFTY 50
BSE SENSEX